Easy Money is a 1936 American crime film directed by Phil Rosen and starring Onslow Stevens, Kay Linaker and Noel Madison.

Cast
 Onslow Stevens as Dan Adams
 Kay Linaker as Carol Carter
 Noel Madison as 'Duke' Trotti
 Allen Vincent as Eddie Adams
 Barbara Barondess as Tonia
 Wallis Clark as Mr. Curtis
 Selmer Jackson as Mr. Harrison
 Robert Homans as Sam Belden
 Robert Graves as Sillsby
 Robert Frazer as Lab Man
 Broderick O'Farrell as Judge
 Barbara Bedford as Mrs. Turner
 Dickie Walters as Little Johnny
 Betty Mack as Telephone Operator
 Henry Hebert as Elmer Johnson
 John Kelly as Carney
 Monte Vandergrift as Moxey
 Allen Wood as Chick
 John Dilson as Rusick

References

Bibliography
 Michael R. Pitts. Poverty Row Studios, 1929–1940: An Illustrated History of 55 Independent Film Companies, with a Filmography for Each. McFarland & Company, 2005.

External links
 

1936 films
1936 crime films
American crime films
Films directed by Phil Rosen
Chesterfield Pictures films
American black-and-white films
1930s English-language films
1930s American films